Xavier Chen (born 5 October 1983) is a former professional footballer who played as a right-back. He began his youth career with Anderlecht before moving to KV Kortrijk where he first played at senior level (2003–2007). After Kortrijk, he spent six years at KV Mechelen (2007–2013) and two at Guizhou Renhe (2013–2015) before returning to KV Mechelen. Born in Belgium, he represented Chinese Taipei at international level.

Personal life
Chen was born to a French mother and a Taiwanese father. His paternal grandfather is a former diplomat who still lives in Taiwan.

Club career
Chen started his senior career in KV Kortrijk, but gained recognition in his first stint with KV Mechelen, where he became captain. Due to the inconvenience of traveling back and forth between Belgium and Taiwan, Chen decided to move to Chinese side Guizhou Renhe when he accepted CTFA's invitation to play for the national team. In January 2016, Chen returned to KV Mechelen, stating that he only wanted to play for a maximum of three years in China. A few Chinese teams showed interest to sign him, but he ultimately decided to return to his country of birth. Altogether, Chen spent seven seasons with KV Mechelen.

International career
Chen's eligibility to play for Taiwan was discovered by the Chinese Taipei Football Association public relations director Chen Chia Ming in 2009, and Chen was invited to play for the national team. The Chinese Football Association had also made an attempt to recruit Chen three months after CTFA. On 24 May 2011, encouraged by his relatives in Taiwan, Chen elected to play for Taiwan.

Chen made his international debut against Malaysia on 3 July 2011 and scored the winning goal. This marked the first time in 10 years that Taiwan beat an opponent that was ranked in the FIFA top 150. The attendance of the game was a record breaking at 15,335, which was 10,000 higher than the average. On 9 October 2015, Chen scored CTFA's third goal in a 5–1 victory over Macau.

International goals
Scores and results list Taiwan's goal tally first, score column indicates score after each Chen goal.

Honours
Guizhou Renhe
 Chinese FA Cup: 2013
 Chinese FA Super Cup: 2014

References

External links
 
 
 
 

1983 births
Living people
People from Sint-Agatha-Berchem
Taiwanese footballers
Belgian footballers
Association football fullbacks
Chinese Taipei international footballers
Belgium youth international footballers
Belgian people of Taiwanese descent
Belgian people of French descent
Taiwanese people of French descent
Belgian Pro League players
Chinese Super League players
K.V. Kortrijk players
K.V. Mechelen players
Beijing Renhe F.C. players
Taiwanese expatriate footballers
Taiwanese expatriate sportspeople in China
Belgian expatriate footballers
Belgian expatriate sportspeople in China
Expatriate footballers in China
Footballers from Brussels